Iván José Marcone (born 3 June 1990) is an Argentine professional footballer who plays as a central midfielder for Independiente.

Club career
Born in Sarandí, Marcone was an Arsenal de Sarandí youth graduate. He made his professional debut on 18 October 2008, coming on as a second half substitute in a 3–3 home draw against Vélez Sársfield for the Primera División championship.

Marcone scored his first goal on 17 October 2009, netting the first in a 1–1 home draw against Banfield. He was an important midfield unit in the club's 2012 Clausura winning campaign, being an ever-present figure.

Marcone was later linked to La Liga outfit Celta de Vigo and Major League Soccer's Chicago Fire, but both offers were rejected by Arsenal. In 2013, he was also strongly linked to Independiente, but nothing came of it.

On 9 January 2015, Marcone joined Getafe CF on loan until June, with a buyout clause. However, the deal was declared void later in the month.

Marcone played as a holding midfielder as Lanus reached the final of the Copa Libertadores in 2017. He was linked to a move to La Liga side UD Las Palmas afterwards as well as Club Tijuana in Mexico and Atletico Nacional in Colombia.

In the summer of 2018, Marcone joined Mexican club Cruz Azul. On 21 July, Marcone debuted with Cruz Azul against Puebla and played the full 90 minutes in Cruz Azul's first match of the Apertura 2018. He won the Copa MX facing C.F. Monterrey in the final. Cruz Azul ended in 1st place in the regular season with Marcone being a very important player to the team. He took Cruz Azul to their first Liga MX final since 2013, where they had lost against Club America in one of the most dramatic finals of all time. They faced Club America again in the final of the Apertura 2018 and tied 0-0 away and lost 2-0 home, both in the Estadio Azteca. In the final, he lost the ball outside the box and ended up costing Cruz Azul the game.

After six months in Mexico with Cruz Azul, he signed for Boca Juniors in January 2019, in hopes of getting called up to the Argentina National Football Team for the Conmebol Copa America 2019 tournament. On 5 October 2020, he was loaned to La Liga side Elche CF, with an obligatory buyout clause.

International career
Marcone was called-up in the Argentina national football team in March 2017. On 26 March 2019, Marcone debuted internationally with the team defeating Morocco, 1–0.

Personal life
Born in Argentina, Marcone is of Italian descent.

Career statistics

Club

Honours
Arsenal
Argentine Primera División: 2012 Clausura
Copa Argentina: 2012–13
Supercopa Argentina: 2012

Lanús
Argentine Primera División: 2016
Copa del Bicentenario: 2016
Supercopa Argentina: 2016

Cruz Azul
Copa MX: Apertura 2018

Boca Juniors
Supercopa Argentina: 2018
Primera División: 2019–20

References

External links
 Iván Marcone at ESPN Deportes 
 
  
 
 

1990 births
Living people
Argentine people of Italian descent
Sportspeople from Avellaneda
Argentine footballers
Association football midfielders
Argentina international footballers
Argentine Primera División players
Arsenal de Sarandí footballers
Club Atlético Lanús footballers
Boca Juniors footballers
Club Atlético Independiente footballers
Liga MX players
Cruz Azul footballers
La Liga players
Elche CF players
Argentine expatriate footballers
Argentine expatriate sportspeople in Mexico
Argentine expatriate sportspeople in Spain
Expatriate footballers in Mexico
Expatriate footballers in Spain